Bondi is a suburb of eastern Sydney, in the state of New South Wales, Australia, seven kilometres east of the Sydney central business district, in the local government area of Waverley Council.

Geography
Bondi is a mostly medium and high-density residential area centred on Bondi Road, where the shopping area is situated. Bondi Beach is a neighbouring suburb and beach on the east side of Bondi. Bondi Junction is a neighbouring suburb and commercial centre to the west of Bondi. Tamarama, Bronte and Waverley are situated on the south side of Bondi.

History
Bondi is said to be a corruption of an Aboriginal word boondi meaning water breaking over rocks. It has been spelt a number of different ways over time, e.g. Boondi, Bundi, Bundye. The current spelling was accepted in 1827.

In the 1880s, Malcolm Campbell built Scarba, a two-storey, Italianate house in Wellington Street. It was later the residence of A.M. Loewenthal, an alderman in the local council. It was purchased by the New South Wales Government just before the First World War, then acquired by the Benevolent Society of New South Wales, who turned it into a children's welfare home known as Scarba House. This lasted until 1986, after which Scarba House became part of the Bondi Centre, which included a retirement village and various other welfare services. It is listed on the local government heritage register. It is now a residence within a large set of apartments on Ocean Street and Wellington Street.

Bondi Public School, located in Wellington Street, was built in 1883. It is also listed on the local government heritage register. Before that, the school ran from St Matthews Church on Ocean Street, which is now one of the sites of Bondi Anglican Church.

Historically, the attractions in the area were Bondi Beach and the shopping centre at Bondi Junction (locally called 'the Junction'). The Bondi of this article developed as a predominantly residential area between the Junction and the beach, with a shopping strip along Bondi Road. Building styles are varied, with examples from the Victorian period (1840–1890), Federation (1890–1915), Inter-War (1915–1940) and contemporary. Terraces of Victorian shops alternate with Federation shops along Bondi Road.

There are a number of active community groups in Bondi. The Bondi Anglican Church is one of the churches and has three sites - at Bondi Junction, Bondi and Bondi Beach. The Wayside Chapel is another church working in Bondi Beach.

Waverley Rugby Club was founded in 1971 and is the local rugby union club, located in Bondi. Since its foundation, Waverley won the first Division Championship four times (in three of which won the First Grade title too); Second Division twice; and Third Division once.

Trams

Tram services to North Bondi via Bondi Road and Campbell Parade from the CBD operated from either Circular Quay (via Bridge and Elizabeth Streets) or Railway Square (via Elizabeth and Liverpool Streets), to Oxford Street. The line then passed down Oxford Street to Bondi Junction, where it branched off from Bronte services, to run down Bondi Road to Fletcher Street, Campbell Parade and then to the North Bondi tram terminus. A feature of this line was the large three-track terminus cut into a hillside at North Bondi, which opened in 1946, as well as an underpass at 331a Bondi Road. Trams entered onto Campbell Parade via the underpass at a point where Bondi Road was too steep. The underpass and cutting have now been filled in, part of which is now public reserve and units.

The line opened in 1884 as a steam tramway to Bondi, then to Bondi Beach in 1894. Electric services commenced in 1902. The line closed in 1960. Current bus route 333 follows the former tram line as far as North Bondi.

A cross country tram line once operated from Bondi to Coogee. The line opened as a steam tramway in 1887, and was electrified in 1902. From 1910, through services operated from Bondi Beach to Coogee Beach, and later additionally from Waverley Depot to Coogee beach. This line branched off Bronte Road at Waverley and travelled south down Albion Street and Frenchmans Road, then via Frances and Cook Streets to join the Coogee line at Belmore Road in Randwick. The line was single track throughout, with a passing loop on Frenchmans Road. Initially services ran from the junction at Albion Street in Waverley to Randwick only, this was later extended to Coogee in 1907. It closed in 1954 and was replaced by bus route 314.

Heritage listings
In addition to those listed above, Bondi has a number of other heritage-listed sites, including:
 36 Anglesea Street: Electricity Substation No. 269
 60 Blair Street: St Anne's Catholic Church, Bondi

Demographics
According to the 2016 census of Population, there were approximately 10,000 residents in Bondi, with 44.7% born in Australia. The most common other countries of birth were England 8.0%, Brazil 3.5%, New Zealand and South Africa 2.6%, and Ireland 2.0%. 64.2% of people only spoke English at home, with other languages spoken at home being Portuguese 3.6%, Russian 3.5%, Spanish 2.9%, French 2.1% and Italian 2.0%.

The most common responses for religion in Bondi were No Religion 35.9%, Catholic 21.2%, Judaism 12.7% and Anglican 6.5%.

Sport and recreation
Bondi is represented in one of the most popular sporting competitions across Australia, the National Rugby League competition, by the local team the Sydney Roosters, officially the Eastern Suburbs District Rugby League Football Club (ESDRLFC) and Bondi United in the South Sydney District Junior Rugby Football League competition.

Media
Bondi FM, established in the early 2000s and broadcast 24 hours a day from the top of Hotel Bondi, became defunct in 2014. The current offerings are Bondi Radio, Bondi Beach Radio, and Radio Bondi FM.

Gallery

References

External links 
Bondi – Sydney.com

Further reading

 Robert Drewe and others. BONDI. Published 1984, then 1993 by Allen & Unwin
 Portia Fitzsimmons. Eastern Suburbs Album. Published by Atrand Pty Ltd, 1985, 1988.

 
All Wikipedia articles written in Australian English
Coordinates on Wikidata
Suburbs of Sydney
Waverley Council